The White Elephant Sessions is a rarities and demo version album by American Christian band Jars of Clay, released in conjunction with the band's third studio album If I Left the Zoo. Several of the tracks come straight from the demo recording sessions for If I Left The Zoo, entitled the Tweed Horse Sessions.

The title and cover

The title is a play on the fact that a white elephant is a rarity, and the cover of If I Left the Zoo had a grey elephant on it.

This album depicts a similar cover, except that the background is primarily red where If I Left the Zoos background is predominantly blue and the elephant on the cover of this album is white and not grey (and the elephant is facing the other direction).

Track listing
Note: All songs are written by Dan Haseltine, Matt Odmark, Stephen Mason and Charlie Lowell, unless noted otherwise
"Unforgetful You" (Remix) - 3:27 
"Crazy Times" (Demo) - 3:37  (Dan Haseltine, Stephen Mason, Mark Hudson, Greg Wells)
"Goodbye, Goodnight" (Demo) - 2:36 
"River Constantine" (Partial Demo) - 2:01 
"Grace" (Hudson & Wells Demo) - 3:51  (Dan Haseltine, Matt Odmark, Stephen Mason, Charlie Lowell, Mark Hudson, Greg Wells)
"Headstrong" (IA Demo) - 4:04 
"Coffee Song" (from Seatbelt Tuba) - 3:02 
"Can't Erase It" (Tweed Horse Sessions Demo) - 3:11 
"Kaylos" - 0:42
"New Math" (Tweed Horse Sessions Demo) - 3:20
"Fly Farther" (duet with Alison Krauss) - 5:31
"Collide" (Tweed Horse Sessions Demo) - 4:15 
"Frail" (Frail Demo Album Version) - 4:04

References

Albums produced by Stephen Lipson
Jars of Clay compilation albums
1999 compilation albums
Essential Records (Christian) compilation albums